Ozlem Nefise Ayduk is an American social psychologist at U.C. Berkeley researching close relationships, emotion regulation, and the development of self-regulation in children. She is a fellow at the Society of Experimental Social Psychology and the Society for Personality and Social Psychology. She has contributed content to several psychology handbooks, dictionaries, and encyclopedias.

Early life
Ayduk became interested in understanding human behavior in middle school when she began reading books on personality and psychopathology. Combined with her longstanding desire to become a scientist, her newfound interest led her to pursue a career in psychology. In 1991, she earned her B.A. in psychology and political science from Boğaziçi University in Istanbul. Moving to America, she earned her M.A. and Ph.D. in psychology from Columbia University in 1995 and 1999, respectively.

Career
Ayduk worked as a postdoctoral fellow at Columbia University for three years before heading west to California in 2002 to join the U.C. Berkeley department of psychology as an assistant professor.  She became an associate professor in 2009, and a full professor in 2015. Ayduk is a co-director of the Relationship and Social Cognition Lab at U.C. Berkeley.

In addition to teaching, Ayduk has been active with professional psychology societies. She is a fellow at the Society of Experimental Social Psychology and served on its executive board (2015–2018). She is also a fellow at the Society for Personality and Social Psychology, where she served on the grant review panel (2016–2017) and a three-year term on the board of directors (2018–2020).

Research
Working with Walter Mischel, Ayduk studied the developmental precursors and long-term consequences of children's ability to delay gratification. They conducted multiple follow-up studies to Mischel's 1972 Stanford marshmallow experiment on delayed gratification in children.  They found that children in the original experiment who were better at delaying gratification as children were also better able to do so as adults, while those who sought instant gratification still did so as adults. Brain imaging of the two groups found differences in the prefrontal cortex and the ventral striatum. After twenty years, the children who delayed gratification displayed "more effective, planful, goal-oriented behavior" and had more successful relationships than their peers. The children who delayed gratification had lower body mass indexes (BMI) than the others over 30 years later. A longitudinal study of another group of preschoolers using cookies instead of marshmallows found those who delayed gratification were more efficient at responding to targets in a go/no-go task performed 10 years later. They replicated the marshmallow experiment in the late 2010s and found that contrary to the popular expectation that children's attention spans had decreased since the original experiment, the children they studied waited one minute longer on average.

Ayduk collaborated with Ethan Kross to study self distancing and emotional regulation by empirically distinguishing adaptive from maladaptive forms of self-reflection. They found indications that people can achieve self distancing by being cued to view their problems through a mental "fly on the wall" perspective. Further research found that people are better at giving themselves good advice when they refer to themselves in the third person. Monitoring people with an EEG found that emotional stress decreased when they began referring to themselves in the third person. fMRI scans showed decreased brain activity when they used their own name instead of the pronoun "I" when recounting emotionally painful past experiences.

Studying rejection sensitivity (RS) in women, Ayduk found those with high rejection expectations tend to have more hostile thoughts about, review less favorably, and are more likely to report conflicts with potential romantic partners who reject them. Further research showed women with high RS are more aggressive towards their rejecters and have higher startle responses to images depicting rejection. A 6-month longitudinal study found women with high RS are more likely to become depressed after a mutual breakup.

Honors
 1993–1994: Delta Kappa Gamma World Fellowship
 1993–1997: Fulbright Fellow
 1993–1998: Faculty Fellowship, Columbia University
 2004: Hellman Fellow
 2008: Fellow, Society of Experimental Social Psychology
 2014: Fellow, American Psychological Society
 2016: Fellow, Society for Personality and Social Psychology

Selected bibliography

Articles
 2015: "Pronouns Matter when Psyching Yourself Up". Harvard Business Review

Books
 2004: Current directions in personality psychology. Pearson Prentice Hall
 2007: Introduction to personality: Toward an integrative science of the person (8th edition). Wiley

Research papers

Self-distancing & emotion regulation
 2005: "When asking 'why' doesn’t hurt: Distinguishing rumination from reflective processing of negative emotions". Psychological Science
 2010: "From a distance: Implications of spontaneous self-distancing for adaptive self-reflection". Journal of Personality and Social Psychology
 2014: "Self-Talk as a Regulatory Mechanism: How You Do It Matters". Journal of Personality and Social Psychology
 2015: "This too shall pass: Temporal Distance and the Regulation of Emotions". Journal of Personality and Social Psychology
 2018: "Self Distancing: Basic Mechanisms and Clinical Implications". In International Handbook of Self-Control in Health and Well Being. Routledge

Self regulation, delay of gratification
 2000: "Regulating the interpersonal self: Strategic self-regulation for coping with rejection sensitivity". Journal of Personality and Social Psychology
 2011: "'Willpower' over the lifespan: decomposing self-regulation". Social Cognitive and Affective Neuroscience
 2011: "Behavioral and neural correlates of delay of gratification 40 years later". Proceedings of the National Academy of Sciences.
 2013: "Preschoolers' delay of gratification predicts their body mass 30 years later". The Journal of Pediatrics
 2014: "The role of emotion and emotion regulation in the ability to delay gratification". In Handbook of Emotion Regulation. Guilford Press

Rejection sensitivity, close relationships
 1999: "Does rejection elicit hostility in rejection sensitive women?". Social Cognition
 2001: "Rejection sensitivity and depressive symptoms in women". Personality and Social Psychology Bulletin
 2002: "Attentional mechanisms linking rejection to hostile reactivity: The role of 'hot' vs. 'cool' focus". Psychological Science
 2007: "Defensive physiological reactions to rejection: the effect of self-esteem and attentional control on startle responses". Psychological Science
 2008: "Individual differences in the rejection-aggression link in the hot sauce paradigm: The case of Rejection Sensitivity". Journal of Experimental Social Psychology

See also
 Stanford marshmallow experiment

References

External links
 RASCL: Relationships and Social Cognition Lab at U.C. Berkeley.
 

21st-century American psychologists
American women psychologists
20th-century American psychologists
University of California, Berkeley College of Letters and Science faculty
Living people
Columbia University School of General Studies alumni
Boğaziçi University alumni
Year of birth missing (living people)
21st-century American women